Guindy metro station is a Metro railway station on the Blue Line of the Chennai Metro, which opened on 21 September 2016 along with the elevated section on the Blue Line. The station is among the elevated stations coming up along corridor I of the Chennai Metro, Wimco Nagar–Chennai International Airport stretch. The station will serve the neighbourhoods of Guindy and Velachery.

The station

The 105-metre-long steel girder rail overbridge, which is the only such structure in the entire Chennai Metro system, lies near the station.

The station is also the only one in the entire system that will have two skywalks providing access to the station—one near the Guindy Industrial Estate and the other near Race Course Road.

Station layout

See also

 List of Chennai metro stations
 Chennai Metro
 Chennai International Airport

References

External links
Official Website for Chennai Metro Rail Limited

Chennai Metro stations
Railway stations in Chennai